Shuko Aoyama and Ena Shibahara defeated Nicole Melichar and Demi Schuurs in the final, 6–1, 6–4, to win the women's doubles tennis title at the 2021 Eastbourne International. It marked their fourth title together of the season, and their seventh consecutive win in a final match over two years. The victory earned Aoyama her 16th career WTA Tour doubles title and Shibahara's seventh.

Chan Hao-ching and Latisha Chan were the defending champions from when the event was last held in 2019, but the pair lost in the semifinals to Melichar and Schuurs.

Seeds

Draw

Draw

References

External Links 
Main Draw

Eastbourne Internationalandnbsp;- Doubles
2021 Women's Doubles